17β-Hydroxysteroid dehydrogenases (17β-HSD, HSD17B), also 17-ketosteroid reductases (17-KSR), are a group of alcohol oxidoreductases which catalyze the reduction of 17-ketosteroids and the dehydrogenation of 17β-hydroxysteroids in steroidogenesis and steroid metabolism. This includes interconversion of DHEA and androstenediol, androstenedione and testosterone, and estrone and estradiol.

The major reactions catalyzed by 17β-HSD (e.g., the conversion of androstenedione to testosterone) are in fact hydrogenation (reduction) rather than dehydrogenation (oxidation) reactions.

Reactions

17β-HSDs have been known to catalyze the following redox reactions of sex steroids:
 20α-Hydroxyprogesterone ↔ Progesterone
  ↔ Androstenediol
 Androstenedione ↔ Testosterone
 Dihydrotestosterone ↔ 5α-Androstanedione / 3α-Androstanediol / 3β-Androstanediol
 Estrone ↔ Estradiol
 16α-Hydroxyestrone ↔ Estriol

Activity distribution

Genes
Genes coding for 17β-HSD include:
 HSD17B1: Referred to as "estrogenic". Major subtype for activation of estrogens from weaker forms (estrone to estradiol and 16α-hydroxyestrone to estriol). Catalyzes the final step in the biosynthesis of estrogens. Highly selective for estrogens; 100-fold higher affinity for estranes over androstanes. However, also catalyzes the conversion of DHEA into androstenediol. Recently, has been found to inactivate DHT into 3α- and 3β-androstanediol. Expressed primarily in the ovaries and placenta but also at lower levels in the breast epithelium. Major isoform of 17β-HSD in the granulosa cells of the ovaries. Mutations and associated deficiency have not been reported in humans. Knockout mice show altered ovarian sex steroid production, normal puberty, and severe subfertility due to defective luteinization and ovarian progesterone production.
 HSD17B2: Describable as "antiestrogenic" and "antiandrogenic". Major subtype for inactivation of estrogens and androgens into weaker forms (estradiol to estrone, testosterone to androstenedione, and androstenediol to DHEA). Also converts inactive 20α-hydroxyprogesterone into active progesterone. Preferential activity on androgens. Expressed widely in the body including in the liver, intestines, lungs, pancreas, kidneys, endometrium, prostate, breast epithelium, placenta, and bone. Said to be responsible for 17β-HSD activity in the endometrium and placenta. Mutations and associated congenital deficiency have not been reported in humans. However, local deficiency in expression of HSD17B2 has been associated with endometriosis.
 HSD17B3: Referred to as "androgenic". Major subtype in males for activation of androgens from weaker forms (androstenedione to testosterone and DHEA to androstenediol). Also activates estrogens from weaker forms to a lesser extent (estrone to estradiol). This is essential for testicular but not ovarian production of testosterone. Not expressed in the ovaries, where another 17β-HSD subtype, likely HSD17B5, is expressed instead. Mutations are associated with  type III deficiency. Males with this condition have pseudohermaphroditism, while females are normal with normal androgen and estrogen levels.
 HSD17B4: Also known as D-bifunctional protein (DBP). Involved in fatty acid β-oxidation and steroid metabolism (specifically estrone to estradiol, for instance in the uterus). Mutations are associated with DBP deficiency and Perrault syndrome (ovarian dysgenesis and deafness).
 HSD17B5: Also known as aldo-keto reductase 1C3 (AKR1C3). Has  and  activity in addition to 17β-HSD activity. Expressed in the adrenal cortex and may act as the "androgenic" 17β-HSD in ovarian thecal cells. Also expressed in the prostate gland, mammary gland, and Leydig cells.
 HSD17B6: Has  activity and catalyzes conversion of the weak androgen androstanediol into the powerful androgen dihydrotestosterone in the prostate gland.
 HSD17B7: Is involved in cholesterol metabolism but is also thought to activate estrogens (estrone to estradiol) and inactivate androgens (dihydrotestosterone to androstanediol). Expressed in the ovaries, breasts, placenta, testes, prostate gland, and liver.
 HSD17B8: Inactivates estradiol, testosterone, and dihydrotestosterone, though can also convert estrone into estradiol. Expressed in the ovaries, testes, liver, pancreas, kidneys, and other tissues.
 HSD17B9: Also known as retinol dehydrogenase 5 (RDH5). Involved in retinoid metabolism. Mutations are associated with fundus albipunctatus.
 HSD17B10: Also known as 2-methyl-3-hydroxybutyryl-CoA dehydrogenase (MHBD). Substrates include steroids, neurosteroids, fatty acids, bile acids, isoleucine, and xenobiotics. Mutations are associated with  type X deficiency (also known as HSD10 disease or MHBD deficiency) and mental retardation, X-linked, syndromic 10 (MRXS10), which are characterized by neurodegeneration and mental retardation, respectively.
 HSD17B11
 HSD17B12
 HSD17B13
 HSD17B14

At least 7 of the 14 isoforms of 17β-HSD are involved in interconversion of 17-ketosteroids and 17β-hydroxysteroids.

Overview

Clinical significance
Mutations in HSD17B3 are responsible for  type III deficiency.

Inhibitors of 17β-HSD type II are of interest for the potential treatment of osteoporosis.

Some inhibitors of 17β-HSD type I have been identified, for example esters of cinnamic acid and various flavones (e.g. fisetin).

See also
 Steroidogenic enzyme

References

External links
 

EC 1.1.1
NADPH-dependent enzymes
NADH-dependent enzymes
Enzymes of known structure